Ray Dooley (born Rachel Rice Dool; died January 28, 1984) was a vaudeville performer in the [Ziegfeld Follies with others including W. C. Fields, Will Rogers and Fanny Brice. From there she moved to other musical stage performances.

Biography
Ray Dooley was born in Glasgow, Scotland as Rachel Rice Dool to Robert Rogers Dooley, an Irish-born circus clown. (The family name was later changed to Dooley.) Her brothers, Gordon, Johnny, and Willie Dooley, were also performers. According to Port of Philadelphia immigration records, Mrs. Mary Doole [sic], aged 29, arrived with her small children, Will (aged four), John (aged two) and Rachel, (11 mos. old), as passengers on board the Manitoban in June 1890. They had sailed from Glasgow, Scotland, and their destination was Pittsburgh, Pennsylvania.

She made her performing debut in a minstrel show in Philadelphia She played "babies and brats" in the Ziegfeld Follies after World War I with  W. C. Fields, Will Rogers, and Fanny Brice, among others. From there she moved to musical stage performances.

Marriage
She eloped with Eddie Dowling; the couple had two children, a son, Jack, and a daughter, Mary Maxine (later Mrs. Clark).

From 1919–34, Dooley teamed with Dowling for Ziegfeld Follies and in Thumbs Up in 1934, after which she retired. She came out of retirement in 1948 to appear in Hope's the Thing and Home Life of a Buffalo.

Death
Ray Dooley died on January 28, 1984, at her home in East Hampton, New York. She was buried alongside her husband in St. Joseph's Cemetery, Cumberland, Providence County, Rhode Island.

References

External links

Year of birth missing
1984 deaths
Actresses from Glasgow
Age controversies
Vaudeville performers
British emigrants to the United States